The Athletics at the 2016 Summer Paralympics – Men's 200 metres T12 event at the 2016 Paralympic Games took place on 16–17 September 2016, at the Estádio Olímpico João Havelange.

Heats

Heat 1 
18:39 16 September 2016:

Heat 2 
18:46 16 September 2016:

Heat 3 
18:53 16 September 2016:

Heat 4 
19:00 16 September 2016:

Semifinals

Semifinal 1 
11:21 17 September 2016:

Semifinal 2 
11:21 17 September 2016:

Final 
19:03 17 September 2016:

Notes

Athletics at the 2016 Summer Paralympics
2016 in men's athletics